The June 10th Movement  or Yuk-ship Undong  ("Six-10 Movement" or "June Tenth Movement"), :ko:6.10 만세운동 was one of the earliest public displays of Korean resistance under the Japanese rule.  The name refers to an event that occurred on  June 10th 1926. It is sometimes referred to as the Manse Demonstrations.

Background
The March 1st movement was a big step forward for Korean independence. Japan had largely suppressed the independence movement, and it had largely gone unnoticed by world powers. Throughout the early 1920s, the Korean provincial government in Shanghai had problems with infighting. In 1921, the Korean government was unable to secure funds from Russia,  and in 1925, Syngman Rhee (이승만) was voted out of the government. These two incidents led to even more instability and division among an already fractured and dysfunctional government. By 1922, things had become even more desperate for Korea. However, during these years, inside Korea, there was increased fervor for political movements that was eventually suppressed during the Japanese cultural rule period.

Events in Korea

After the March 1st Movement of 1919, Korea had several national independence movements that were unorganized and unsuccessful.  The 1920s were a time that the students began to have more of an influential role in these movements and in 1926, for the first time since 1919 there was another organized national independence movement. In 1910 Emperor Sunjong of Korea had only been ruling for 4 years when Japan took over with military rule, then on 26 April 1926, Sunjong died and all of Korea mourned. Japan remembered how much the March 1st Movement had affected the country after Emperor Gojong had died in 1919.  The Japanese government did not want another national movement and so, after Sunjong died, the Japanese began to more closely watch the Koreans for any talk of movement.  In addition to the stricter monitoring of the Koreans, the Japanese government also stationed a total of over 7,000 troops in Gyeong-song, and also brought navy ships to the ports of Incheon and Pusan. 
There were three different parts to the June 10th movement. The first part was centered on the socialist Gwon O-seol.  Gwon O-seol printed a large sum of counterfeit Chinese money using a newspaper printer and the Japanese government discovered the printing press and destroyed it. The second part of the national independence movement was the highly educated university students. On the day of Sunjong's death over 800 students from the Joseon Student Science Association gathered in Keijo under the guise of a student picnic and decided to use the death of Sunjong for a reason to have an independence movement, just like the March 1st movement had used the death of Emperor Gojong.  Three weeks later at a Korean university in Keijo, about 400 students finalized the decision to have the public protest on the same day as Sunjong's funeral. The leaders were chosen, and the preparation details were sorted out. The final preparations went smoothly despite the threat of being discovered by the Japanese who were, as time grew closer to the day of the funeral, becoming increasingly watchful. Flags, statements and flyers were made, and after 10,000 flyers were printed, the students took them back to their respective schools and began dispersing them amongst the student population.  The third and most surprising part of the June 10th movement was the participation of middle school students. A handful of middle school students, after hearing of the death of Sunjong, wanted to get involved and participated in the demonstrations.
After all the declarations had been dispersed to every student involved, the day of Sunjong's funeral came and at 8:30am 240,000 students including about 300 middle school students, lined the streets and paraded through downtown Keijo scattering the independence proclamations and shouting "10,000 years of independent Joseon! (조선독립만세)" Throughout the day many students joined the movement as it went to different areas of the city.

Aftermath
Since the protests were a movement similar to the March 1st movement, the military was deployed to suppress the protestors. 210 students were caught in Keijo and 1,000 total students were detained in protests around the country.  Most of the students were shortly released, however 106 students were investigated and 53 were imprisoned. Later that month on 25 June, seven students were prosecuted and sent to trial for the illegal production and distribution of documents.  The seven students were sentenced to various prison terms ranging from one to three years.

Significance
The June 10th movement of 1926 was the first street demonstration for national independence that had been solely planned and carried out by students.  The movement of June 10th unified the students and created a fraternity that would continue to plan and carry out anti-Japanese movements.  The 1926 movement revived the independence movement in Korea that had grown stagnant, and help inspire and sustain the sentiment for until the next movement in 1929 in Gwangju.

See also
History of Korea
Korean independence movement
Colonial Korea
Provisional Government of Korea

Sources

Korean independence movement
20th century in Korea
Protests in Korea